Government Arts College, Ambedkar Veedhi, is oldest government general degree college located at Ambedkar Veedhi, K.R. Circle, Bangalore, Karnatka. It is situated in the heart of Bangalore city. It was established in the year 1886. The college is affiliated with Bangalore University. This college offers different courses in arts.

Departments

Arts and Commerce

Kannada
English
History
Political Science
Sociology
Journalism
Geography
Psychology
Economics
Commerce

Accreditation
The college is  recognized by the University Grants Commission (UGC).

References

External links
http://gfgc.kar.nic.in/gac/

Educational institutions established in 1886
1886 establishments in India
Colleges affiliated to Bangalore University
Colleges in Bangalore